The 2020 Charleston Battery season was the club's 28th year of existence, their 17th season in the second tier of the United States soccer league system. It was their tenth season in the USL Championship (USLC) as part of the Eastern Conference. This article covers the period from November 18, 2019, the day after the 2019 USLC Playoff Final, to the conclusion of the 2020 USLC Playoff Final, scheduled for November 12–16, 2020. The season was interrupted by the COVID-19 pandemic in March and later resumed in July.

Current roster

Competitions

Exhibitions

USL Championship

Standings — Group H

Match results
On December 20, 2019, the USL announced the 2020 season schedule, creating the following fixture list for the early part of Charleston's season. In the preparations for the resumption of league play following the shutdown prompted by the coronavirus pandemic, Charleston's schedule was announced on July 2.

USL Cup Playoffs

References

Charleston Battery seasons
Charleston Battery
Charleston Battery
Charleston Battery